Park Tower at Transbay is a 43-story,  office skyscraper in San Francisco, California. The tower is located on Block 5 of the San Francisco Transbay development plan at the corner of Beale and Howard Streets, near the Transbay Transit Center. The tower contains  of office space. The entire office space has been leased by Facebook.

History

Block 5, an area bounded by Howard, Main, Beale and Natoma Streets, was formerly a state-owned parcel used for ramps leading to the since-demolished Transbay Terminal and Embarcadero Freeway. The block is bisected by a driveway for the neighboring Providian Financial Building.

Four development teams submitted proposals for the site: Boston Properties with Kohn Pedersen Fox; Golub Real Estate and The John Buck Company with Goettsch Partners and Solomon Cordwell Buenz; Jay Paul Company with Skidmore, Owings & Merrill; and Kilroy Realty with Pelli Clarke Pelli. The proposal from Golub Real Estate and The John Buck Company was ultimately selected, featuring a number of large, outdoor terraces on both the northwest and southeast corners of the building. The development group paid US$172.5 million to acquire the property in September 2015. Ceremonial groundbreaking took place on October 6, 2015, with MetLife taking a majority stake in the project, reportedly worth US$345 million for a 95% ownership stake. The lobby was designed by Interior Architects.

Images

See also
 List of tallest buildings in San Francisco

External links
 Facebook leases Park Tower

References

Skyscraper office buildings in San Francisco
South of Market, San Francisco